Always Say Goodbye is an album by American jazz bassist Charlie Haden's Quartet West that was recorded in 1993 and released on the Verve label.
The "intro" and the "ending" tracks feature excerpts from Hawks's masterpiece The Big Sleep.

Reception 

Eric Brace of The Washington Post wrote that the album "takes music and dialogue from films like Howard Hawks's The Big Sleep, and combines them with Quartet West originals and standards from past eras to create a romantic sound collage that won Down Beat magazine's Album of the Year award in 1994."

The AllMusic review by Daniel Gioffre awarded the album 4 stars, stating, "Always Say Goodbye is part of the continuing Quartet West project by Haden, in which the venerable bassist attempts to evoke the spirit of Hollywood circa 1930-1940... The results, though at first a little bit unsettling, are quite spectacular... Highly recommended".

Track listing 
All compositions by Charlie Haden except as indicated.
 Introduction (Max Steiner / Adolph Deutsch) - 0:58
 "Always Say Goodbye" - 6:38
 "Nice Eyes" - 5:04
 "Relaxin' at Camarillo" (Charlie Parker) - 3:58
 "Sunset Afternoon" (Alan Broadbent) - 4:13
 "My Love and I [Love Song from Apache] (Johnny Mercer, David Raksin) - 3:19
 "Alone Together" (Howard Dietz, Arthur Schwartz) - 5:21
 "Our Spanish Love Song" - 6:07
 "Background Music" (Warne Marsh) - 4:45
 "Ou Es-Tu, Mon Amour? (Where Are You, My Love?)" (Henry Lemarchand, Emil Stern) - 6:44
 "Avenue of Stars" (Broadbent) - 5:52
 "Low Key Lightly [Variation on the Theme of Hero to Zero]" (Duke Ellington) - 4:52
 "Celia" (Bud Powell) - 4:57
 "Everything Happens to Me" (Tom Adair, Matt Dennis) - 6:25
 Ending - 0:34

Personnel
Charlie Haden – bass
Ernie Watts - tenor saxophone
Alan Broadbent - piano
Larance Marable - drums
Stéphane Grappelli - violin (track 10)

References 

Verve Records albums
Charlie Haden albums
1994 albums
Sound collage albums